J. Robert Bren (July 23, 1903 – October 1, 1981) was a Mexican-American screenwriter and producer who was active from the mid-1930s through the mid-1950s. He wrote either the story or screenplay for thirty feature films, as well as producing at least two of those films.

Life and career
Born Jose Roberto Bustamante Gutierrez on July 23, 1903, in Guanajuato, Mexico, he entered the film industry, working on the sound crew for the 1933 film, Face in the Sky. The following year he began writing stories for films, the first of which was the 20th Century Fox film, Looking for Trouble, starring Spencer Tracy and Jack Oakie. He was also one of the story authors for The Band Plays On (1933), starring Robert Young. In 1937 he was one of three writers who expanded an unpublished Damon Runyon story which was turned into the screenplay for Racing Lady, which starred Ann Dvorak, Smith Ballew, and Harry Carey. Bren was one of the writers of the screenplay for The Man Who Found Himself, also in 1937, featuring Joan Fontaine in her first starring role, along with John Beal.

In 1942, Bren co-wrote the original story for the film, In Old California, starring John Wayne. Bren produced the 1945 film, First Yank into Tokyo, from a screenplay he wrote. The film stars Tom Neal and Barbara Hale, and was directed by Gordon Douglas. To open the film, Bren secured the rights to a tape of Japan's prime minister, Kuniaki Koiso, in which he exhorts the Japanese population to "sacrifice everything to repulse the enemy." Bren served on the California State Welfare Board in 1949. Also on the board was Hazel Hurst, a blind young lady who was famous for advocacy for the blind, especially for the use of guide dogs. She was one of the founders of the Hurst Foundation. Bren wrote a screenplay based on Hurst's life. The 1954 film, Naked Alibi, directed by Jerry Hopper and starring Sterling Hayden and Gloria Grahame, was based on a story by Bren and his long-time writing partner, Gladys Atwater. Bren's last big screen writing credit was again as story co-writer with Atwater for The Treasure of Pancho Villa, directed by George Sherman, and starring Rory Calhoun, Shelley Winters and Gilbert Roland.

Filmography
(as per AFI's database)

References

External links
 
 

1903 births
1981 deaths
Writers from Guanajuato
American film producers
20th-century American businesspeople
American writers of Mexican descent
20th-century American screenwriters
Mexican emigrants to the United States